Cristina Dinu and Ganna Poznikhirenko were the defending champions, but lost to Andrea Gámiz and Paula Cristina Gonçalves in the quarterfinals.

Gámiz and Gonçalves won the title, defeating Anastasia Grymalska and Giorgia Marchetti in the final, 6–3, 4–6, [12–10].

Seeds

Draw

Draw

References
Main Draw

Internazionali Femminili di Brescia - Doubles